The Park Blocks, formerly known as Hitching Post Square, are an urban plaza in Eugene, Oregon, United States. Tom Hardy's untitled fountain and sculpture (1952) and Jan Zach's Three Standing Forms (1959 are both installed in the park.

References

Parks in Eugene, Oregon